The Louisville Cardinals softball team represents University of Louisville in NCAA Division I college softball.  The team participates in the Atlantic Coast Conference. The Cardinals are currently led by head coach Holly Aprile. The team plays its home games at Ulmer Stadium located on the university's campus.

History

Coaching history

Championships

Conference Championships

Conference Tournament Championships

Coaching staff

Awards and honors

Conference awards and honors
Sources:

Conference USA Player of the Year
Courtney Moore, 2005

Conference USA Freshman of the Year
Audrey Rendon, 2004

Big East Player of the Year
Melissa Roth, 2009
Chelsea Bemis, 2010

Big East Pitcher of the Year
Catherine Bishop, 2006

References

 
2000 establishments in Kentucky
Sports clubs established in 2000